Johnson is one of the most widely distributed surnames in the English-speaking world. Following is a list of notable people and fictional characters with the surname Johnson:

Common combinations with the surname "Johnson"

Notable individuals with surname Johnson

Arts, music, and letters
Al Johnson (musician) (1948–2013), American singer, arranger, producer
Alice E. Johnson (1862–1936), American architect
Alphonso Johnson (born 1951), American jazz bassist
Amy Jo Johnson (born 1970), American actor, singer, and songwriter
Andre Johnson (born 1970), known as Jah Mason, Jamaican reggae artist
Andreas Johnson (born 1970), Swedish singer
Arte Johnson (1929–2019), American comic actor
Ashley Johnson (born 1983), American actor, voice actor, and internet personality
B. S. Johnson (1933–1973), English experimental novelist, poet, literary critic,  television producer, and filmmaker
Brian Johnson (born 1947), British-born lead singer of the Australian rock band AC/DC
Bunk Johnson (1879–1949), American jazz musician
Buzz Johnson (1951–2014), Tobago-born publisher and activist 
C. David Johnson (born 1955), Canadian actor
Carmencita Johnson (1923–2000), American actor
Carrie Johnson (journalist), justice correspondent
Carrie Ashton Johnson (1863–1949), American editor and author
Whoopi Goldberg (born Caryn Johnson in 1955), American actress, comedian, author, and television personality
Chalmers Johnson (1931–2010), American author
Chubby Johnson (1903–1974), American actor
Clare Johnson, American writer and artist
Clark Johnson (born 1954), American actor and director
Claude Joseph Johnson (1913–1990), American gospel singer
Claudette Johnson (born 1959), British visual artist
Crockett Johnson (1906–1975), cartoonist and children's book illustrator
D. E. Johnson (aka Dan E. Johnson), American author
Dakota Johnson (born 1989), American actor
Dink Johnson (1892–1954), American jazz musician
Dwayne Johnson (aka The Rock, born 1972), American actor and professional wrestler
Edith North Johnson (1903–1988), American classic female blues singer, pianist and songwriter
Eliana Johnson (born 1984), American magazine editor 
Elliott Johnson (born 1975), American artist and designer
Erica Johnson, Canadian broadcaster and journalist
Erika Johnson (born 1982), American actor
Evan Malbone Johnson (1791–1865), American priest and religious writer
Geir Johnson (1953–2021), Norwegian composer, writer and initiator of culture projects
George Johnson, American guitarist and singer, member of The Brothers Johnson
George Matthew Johnson, American author and activist
Gertrude Johnson (1894–1973), Australian soprano
Henry "Rufe" Johnson (1908–1974), American Piedmont blues musician
Holly Johnson (born 1960), English artist, musician and writer
Irving Johnson (1905–1991), author and adventurer
Jake Johnson (born 1978), American actor
Jef Johnson, American clown
Jenn Johnson, American Christian singer, songwriter and worship pastor
Jeremiah Johnson (blues musician) (born 1972), an American blues singer, guitarist and songwriter
Johnson (composer) (1953–2011), Indian film score composer and director
Johnson (rapper) (born 1979), Danish rapper Marc Johnson
Jill Johnson (born 1973), Swedish country singer
Joanna Johnson (born 1961), American actor
KC Johnson (born (1967), Professor of History at Brooklyn College and the City University of New York, known for his work exposing the facts about the Duke lacrosse case
Kerry G. Johnson (born 1966), African-American cartoonist, graphic designer, and children's book illustrator
Kim Johnson (musician), American vocalist
Kim Johnson (politician), British Labour Party MP for Liverpool Riverside since 2019
Laura Johnson (born 1957), American actor
Linton Kwesi Johnson, (born 1952), Jamaican United Kingdom-based dub poet
Liza Johnson (born 1970), American film director, producer, and writer
Lois Johnson (1942–2014), American country music singer
Lou Johnson (singer) (1941–2019), American soul singer and pianist
Louis Johnson (bassist) (1955–2015), American bass player and singer, member of The Brothers Johnson
Luther "Houserocker" Johnson (1939–2019), American blues singer and guitarist
L.V. Johnson (1946–1994), American Chicago blues and soul-blues guitarist, singer and songwriter
Marv Johnson (1938–1993), American R&B and soul singer
Mary Johnson (singer) (1898 or 1900–1983), American classic female blues singer, accordionist and songwriter
Mary Coffin Johnson (1834–1928), American activist and writer
Molly Johnson, Canadian singer-songwriter
Nedra Johnson (born 1966), American singer-songwriter
Penny Johnson Jerald (born 1961), American actor
Philip Johnson (1906–2005), American architect
Puff Johnson (1972–2013), American singer
Rachel Johnson (born 1965), British editor and journalist
Ramone Johnson, known as Cashis (born 1982), American rapper
Richard Johnson (architect) (born 1946), Australian architect
Robb Johnson (born 1955), British musician and songwriter
Russell Johnson (1924–2014), American TV and film actor
Ruth Johnson (born 1959), American politician in Michigan
Ruth Johnson (known also as Ruth Horsting and Ma Renu; 1919–2000), American sculptor, professor, and philanthropist
Samuel Johnson (1709-1784), English poet, essayist, lexicographer and "man of letters"
Scarlett Alice Johnson (born 1985), English actor
Sophia Orne Johnson (1826–1899), American author
Taborah Johnson (born 1953), actor and jazz singer
Van Johnson (1916–2008), American actor
W. Bolingbroke Johnson, pseudonym of Morris Bishop (1893–1973), American author and scholar
Wesley Johnson (1945–2009), aka Wess, American-born Italian singer and bass guitarist
Wilko Johnson (1947–2022), English singer, guitarist, songwriter and actor

Politics, law, and government
Andrew Johnson (1808–1875), 17th president of the United States of America
Axel Johnson (Wisconsin politician) (1870–1924)
A. R. Johnson (1856–1933), Louisiana politician
Bernette Joshua Johnson (born 1943), American jurist
Bob Johnson (Arkansas state representative), member of the Arkansas House of Representatives
Boris Johnson (born 1964), UK Prime Minister
Cavalier Johnson, American politician
Cecil E. Johnson (1888–1955), Chief Justice of the Arkansas Supreme Court
Clark Johnson (politician) (born 1952), American politician (Minnesota)
Dean Johnson (politician) (born 1947), American politician
Dusty Johnson (born 1976), American politician
Ebenezer Johnson (1786–1849), first mayor of Buffalo, New York
Ellen Johnson (born 1955), American political activist
Eliza McCardle Johnson (1810–1876), wife of U.S. president Andrew Johnson
Frank Minis Johnson (1918–1999), American jurist
Gerald W. Johnson (1919–2002), American military general
Greta Johnson (born 1977), politician
Helen Kendrick Johnson (1844–1917), American writer, poet, and activist
Huey Johnson (1933–2020), American environmentalist and politician
Isaac Johnson (colonist) (c. 1601–1630), English colonist and one of the founders of Massachusetts 
Isaac Johnson (1803–1853), 12th governor of the state of Louisiana
J. Neely Johnson (1825–1872), California governor
Jacob Johnson (born 1948), Swedish politician
Jay W. Johnson (1943–2009), American politician
Kim Johnson, British politician elected 2019
Kristina M. Johnson (born 1957), American businesswoman, academic, engineer, and government official
Lady Bird Johnson (1912–2007), former First Lady of the United States and businesswoman
Lee A. Johnson (born 1947), American lawyer
Luci Baines Johnson (born 1947), youngest daughter of U.S. President Lyndon B. Johnson and Lady Bird Johnson
Lynda Bird Johnson Robb (born 1944), eldest daughter of U.S. President Lyndon B. Johnson and Lady Bird Johnson
Lyndon B. Johnson (1908–1973), 36th President of the United States (1963–69), 37th Vice President of the United States (1961–63) and a Senator from Texas.
Marsha P. Johnson (1945–1992), American gay liberation activist and drag queen
Oswald H. Johnson (1912–1993), American politician
Phillip E. Johnson (1940–2019), American law professor and a founder of the Intelligent Design movement
Pierre-Marc Johnson (born 1946), 24th Premier of Quebec
Ron Johnson (born 1955), Wisconsin politician
Shirley Johnson (1937–2021), Michigan politician
Vaughan Johnson (politician) (1947–2023), Australian politician
Verne C. Johnson (1925–2012), Minnesota politician
Willard Johnson (politician) (1820–1900), New York politician
William Dartnell Johnson (1870–1948), Western Australian MLA
William Johnson (Australian politician) (1871–1916), Australian politician and soldier

Sciences and medicine
Angas Johnson (1873–1951), Australian physician 
Florence Merriam Johnson (c. 1876–1954), American nurse
Hosmer Allen Johnson (1822–1891), American physician
James Yate Johnson (1820–1900), English naturalist
Katherine Johnson (1918–2020), American mathematician 
Kathleen R. Johnson, American paleoclimatologist
Marcia K. Johnson (born 1943), American psychologist
Reynold B. Johnson (1906–1998), American inventor and computer pioneer 
Virginia E. Johnson (1925–2013), American sexologist
Leslie Peter Johnson (1930–2016), English philologist
Veronica Johnson, American meteorologist

Sports
Alec Johnson (born 1944), English cricketer
Alissa Johnson (born 1987), American ski jumper
Andre Johnson (born 1981), American football player
B. J. Johnson (born 1987), American swimmer
Benny Johnson (American football) (1948–1988), American football player
Berry Johnson (1906–1985), New Zealand rower
Bobby Johnson (born 1951), American football coach
Brandon Johnson (linebacker) (born 1983), American football player
Brandon Johnson (athlete) (born 1985), American middle-distance runner
 Bryce Johnson (born 1995), American baseball player
Buddy Johnson (American football) (born 1999), American football player
Cade Johnson (born 1999), American football player
Calvin Johnson (born 1985), American football player
Carlton Johnson (born 1969), American football player
Carrie Johnson (canoeist), (born 1984), American Olympian
Chad Johnson (born 1978), American football player
Chris Johnson (basketball, born 1985), American player with Auckland Huskies
Chris Johnson (basketball, born 1990), American player in the Israeli Basketball Premier League
Christian Johnson (born 1986), American football player
Collin Johnson (born 1997), American football player
Curley "Boo" Johnson (born 1965), American basketball player
Dallas Johnson (born 1982), Australian rugby league footballer
Danny Johnson (American football) (born 1995), American football player
Darcy Johnson (born 1983), American football player
Darnell Johnson (born 1998), English footballer
Davey Johnson (born 1943), American baseball player and manager
Delano Johnson (born 1988), American football player
D'Ernest Johnson (born 1996), American football player
Diontae Johnson (born 1998), American football player
Dorian Johnson (born 1994), American football player
Dustin Johnson (born 1984), American golfer
Elijah Johnson (basketball) (born 1990), American player in the Israeli Basketball Premier League
Ethel Johnson (wrestler) (1935–2018), American professional wrestler
Hammond Johnson (1883–1919), American college football and baseball coach
Isaiah Johnson (American football, born May 1992) (born 1992), American football player
Isaiah Johnson (cornerback) (born 1996), American football player
Ivan Johnson (basketball) (born 1984), American basketball player
Jakob Johnson (born 1994), American football player
Jaleel Johnson (born 1994), American football player
Jamar Johnson (born 1999), American football player
Jaquan Johnson (born 1996), American football player
Jaylon Johnson (born 1999), American football player
Jimmie Johnson (born 1975), American NASCAR driver
Jing Johnson (1894–1950), American baseball player
Jon'Vea Johnson (born 1996), American football player
Josh Johnson (baseball coach) (born 1986), American baseball coach
J. R. Johnson (born 1979), American football player
Junior Johnson (1931–2019), American NASCAR driver and team owner
Juwan Johnson (born 1996), American football player
KeeSean Johnson (born 1996), American football player
Keldon Johnson (born 1999), American basketball player
Ken Johnson (right-handed pitcher), American baseball player
Kermit Johnson (born 1952), American football player
Kerryon Johnson (born 1997), American football player
Keyshawn Johnson (born 1972), American football player and ESPN broadcaster
Kris Johnson (basketball) (born 1975), American basketball player
Kyron Johnson (born 1998), American football player
Lance Johnson (born 1963), American baseball player
Leavander Johnson (1969–2005), American boxer
Len Johnson (boxer) (1902–1969), English boxer
Lonnie Johnson Jr. (born 1995), American football player
Lyndon Johnson (American football) (born 1994), American football player
Magic Johnson (born 1959), American basketball player and businessman
Marques Johnson (born 1956), American basketball player and basketball analyst
Max Johnson (born 2001), American football player
Michael Johnson (sprinter) (born 1967), American athlete and Gold Medal Olympian
Mickey Johnson (born 1952), American basketball player
Myles Johnson (born 1999), American basketball player
Nazeeh Johnson (born 1998), American football player
Bisi Johnson (Olabisi Johnson, born 1997), American football player
Oli Johnson (born 1987), English footballer
P. J. Johnson (born 1995), American football player
Pierce Johnson (born 1991), American baseball player
Rafer Johnson (1935–2020), American decathlete and actor
Randy Johnson (born 1963), American baseball player
Rocky Johnson (1944–2020; birth name Wayde Bowles), Canadian professional wrestler and father of Dwayne Johnson
Roderick Johnson (born 1995), American football player
Roschon Johnson (born 2001), American football player
Rudi Johnson (born 1979), American football player
Samson Johnson, Togolese basketball player
Shaun Johnson (born 1990), New Zealand rugby league international
Shawn Johnson (born 1992), American gymnast
Spider Johnson (1907–1966), American football player
T. J. Johnson (American football) (born 1990), American football player
Taron Johnson (born 1996), American football player
Taylor Johnson (rugby league), rugby league footballer of the 1920s
Tiffani Johnson (born 1975), American basketball player
Travis Johnson (defensive end) (born 1982), American football player
Ty Johnson (American football) (born 1997), American football player
Tyren Johnson (born 1988), American basketball player
Tyron Johnson (born 1996), American football player
Van Johnson (racing driver) (1927–1959), American racing driver
Vaughan Johnson (1962–2019), American football player
Zion Johnson (born 1999), American football player

Other
Amy Johnson (1903–1941), pioneering English aviator
Benton Johnson (born 1928), American sociologist
Bessilyn Johnson (1871–1943), wife of Albert Mussey Johnson
Bradley Tyler Johnson (1829–1903), American Civil War general
Bushrod Johnson (1817–1880), U.S. Confederate Army general
Eben Samuel Johnson (1886–1939), English-American Methodist bishop
Electa Amanda Wright Johnson (1938-1929), American philanthropist, writer
F. Ross Johnson (1931–2016), CEO of RJR Nabisco
Gertrude I. Johnson (1876–1961), co-founder of Johnson & Wales University
Gisle Johnson (Scouting) (1934–2014), Chief Scout of the Norges Speiderforbund
Guion Griffis Johnson (1900–1989), American historian
Guy Benton Johnson (1901–1991), American social anthropologist
John Thad Johnson (1893–1927), aviator
Jotham Johnson (1905–1967), American archaeologist
Lacey Robert Johnson (1854–1915), Canadian Pacific Railway pioneer
Lilian Wyckoff Johnson (1864–1956), American educator
Liver-Eating Johnson (c. 1824–1900), mountain man of the American Old West
Lycurgus Johnson (1818–1876), American cotton planter and politician.
Margaret Johnson Erwin Dudley (1821–1863), American plantation owner in the Antebellum South
Marilyn Johnson (1928–2007), American bridge player
Osgood Johnson (1803–1837), 5th Principal of Phillips Academy
Peggy Johnson (1976–1999), American female murder victim
R. Milton Johnson, American chief executive
Sarah Marie Johnson (born 1987), American murderess
Scott Johnson (19611988), American PhD student in mathematics and victim of a 1988 suspected homophobic murder in Australia
Victor S. Johnson Jr. (1916–2008), American businessman
Victor S. Johnson Sr. (1882–1943), American businessman
Wallace E. Johnson (1901–1988), co-founder of Holiday Inn
William Hallock Johnson (1865–1963), American educator and president of Lincoln University

Fictional characters
Adrian Johnson (Oz), an African American correctional officer in the HBO drama Oz
Alice Johnson, a character in the A Nightmare on Elm Street franchise
Agent Johnson, a character in The Matrix franchise
Angelina Johnson, a character in the Harry Potter franchise
Avery Johnson from the video game series Halo
Bergholt Stuttley Johnson (known as Bloody Stupid Johnson), from Terry Pratchett's Discworld books
Carl "CJ" Johnson, from the video game Grand Theft Auto: San Andreas
Cave Johnson, the CEO of Aperture Laboratories from Portal 2
Christopher Johnson, a character from the 2009 science fiction film District 9
Daisy Johnson, a character in Marvel Comics
E. Normus Johnson, a character used to advertise Big Johnson T-shirts
Janie Johnson, a character from books written by Caroline B. Cooney
Jeremy Johnson, a character from Phineas and Ferb
Johnson Johnson, the hero of a series of mystery novels written by Dorothy Dunnett
Mr. Johnson (Sesame Street), a Fat Blue character on Sesame Street
Olivia Johnson, a character from Hollyoaks
Shelly Johnson, a character from the Twin Peaks TV series
Suzy Johnson, a character from Phineas and Ferb
Tilda Johnson aka Nightshade, a character in Marvel Comics
Tyrone Johnson, Cloak of Cloak and Dagger in Marvel Comics

See also
Johnson (surname)
General Johnson (disambiguation)
Governor Johnson (disambiguation)
Justice Johnson (disambiguation)
President Johnson (disambiguation)
Johnston (surname)
Johnstone (surname)

Johnson